Decker is a surname of German origin. Notable people with the surname include:

People

Arts and entertainment
Brooklyn Decker, American model
Carol Decker, English recording artist
Daniel Decker, Puerto Rican composer
Franz-Paul Decker (1923–2014), German conductor
Georg Decker (1818–1894), Austrian portrait artist
Hans Decker, German sculptor of the fifteenth century
Jennifer Decker, French actress
Johann Stephan Decker (1784–1844), French painter
John Decker (artist) (1895–1947), German painter, set designer and caricaturist in Hollywood
Lindsey Decker (1923–1994), American artist
Mary Beth Decker (b. 1981), American model
Richard Decker, cartoonist in The New Yorker
Jorel Decker, musical artist in band Hollywood Undead

Government and politics
Bob Decker (1922-1999), American politician and educator
Edward Decker (1827–1911), American businessman and politician in Kewaunee County, Wisconsin
Eileen M. Decker, American lawyer
George Decker, American Chief of Staff of the United States Army
Grant Decker, American politician
James Eric (Bill) Decker (1898–1970), Sheriff of Dallas, Texas during the assassination of John F. Kennedy
John Decker (fire chief) (1823–1892), American businessman, politician and firefighter
John A. Decker (died 2006), American Chief Judge of the Wisconsin Court of Appeals
Michael P. Decker, American politician
Wilhelm Decker, German publicist

Sports

Baseball
Bill Decker, American college baseball coach
Cody Decker (born 1987), American baseball player
Jaff Decker (born 1990), American baseball player
Nick Decker (born 1999), American baseball player
Steve Decker (born 1965), American baseball player

Motorsport
Claire Decker (born 1995), American stock car racing driver
Natalie Decker (born 1997), American stock car racing driver
Paige Decker (born 1993), American stock car racing driver

Other sports
Brianna Decker (born 1991), American ice hockey player
Eric Decker (born 1987), American football player
Karl Decker (footballer) (1921–2005), Austrian footballer
Mary Decker (born 1958), American middle-distance runner

Other
Almarian Decker, American electrical engineer
Ed Decker, American evangelist
John Decker (fire chief) (1823–1892), American businessman, politician and firefighter
Karl Decker (1897–1945), German general
Matthew Decker, Dutch-born English merchant and writer
Scott Decker, American criminologist
Susan Decker, American corporate executive

Fictional characters
Matt Decker, character in Star Trek
Chloe Decker, character in Lucifer
Colonel Roderick Decker, archenemy of The A-Team
Willard Decker, character in Star Trek

See also
Deckers (surname)
Dekker (surname)
Dikkers

German-language surnames